is a Japanese Go player. He is one of the 'Six Supers' who championed Japanese Go in the last three decades of Japanese Go.

Biography 
Koichi Kobayashi was born in Asahikawa, Japan. In 1965, he came to Tokyo to be a disciple of Minoru Kitani. He studied along with Cho Chikun, Masao Kato, Yoshio Ishida, and Masaki Takemiya. He went on to marry the daughter of his teacher, Reiko Kitani (1939–1996), a 6-dan who has won the All-Japan Women's Championship several times.  Together they had a daughter, Izumi Kobayashi, who is now one of the leading female Go players in Japan. Kobayashi is one of the few Go players who have won more than 1,200 professional games. Kobayashi's rivalry with Cho Chikun has continued for some time and they frequently play against each other.

Career
Two years after joining Kitani Minoru's dojo, Kobayashi was promoted to be a 1-dan professional. His first tournament victory came from the 4th Shin Ei in 1972. In 1976, he won his first major title, Tengen.

Promotion record

Titles and runners-up 
Kobayashi is Honorary Kisei, Honorary Meijin and Honorary Gosei. He ranks #3 in the total number of titles in Japan.

References

1952 births
Japanese Go players
Living people
People from Asahikawa